Prebble Glacier is a glacier, 9 nautical miles (17 km) long, flowing westward from Mount Kirkpatrick in Queen Alexandra Range to enter Walcott Neve north of Fremouw Peak. Named by the Northern Party of the New Zealand Geological Survey Antarctic Expedition (NZGSAE) (1961–62) for Michael Prebble, of the base support party, who assisted the party with preparations and training.

It is possible that this Michael Prebble from 1961-62 is the same Mike Prebble who was Leader of Scott Base for the 1965-66 season.

References

Glaciers of Shackleton Coast